Guðrún Eva Mínervudóttir is an Icelandic writer born on 17 March 1976. She studied philosophy at the University of Iceland. 

Her first novel and collection came out in 1998 to acclaim. She has written five novels since then. In 2000, her novel Fyrirlestur um hamingjuna ("Lecture on Happiness") was nominated for the Icelandic Literary Prize. In 2006 she was awarded the DV Culture Prize for the novel Yosoy. In 2012, she was awarded the Icelandic Literary Prize for Allt með kossi vekur ("Everything Is Woken with a Kiss").

Bibliography
Skaparinn (2008) (translated as The Creator, 2012)

References

External links
"Guðrún Eva Mínervudóttir" at literature.is, Reykjavík City Library, Retrieved 7 July 2015

1976 births
Gudrun Eva Minervudottir
Gudrun Eva Minervudottir
Gudrun Eva Minervudottir
Living people
University of Iceland alumni
21st-century Icelandic philosophers